Antrim (meaning 'lone ridge') is a town and civil parish in County Antrim in the northeast of Northern Ireland, on the banks of the Six Mile Water, on the northeast shore of Lough Neagh. It had a population of 23,375 people in the 2011 Census. It is the county town of County Antrim and was the administrative centre of Antrim Borough Council.

History

Middle Ages
According to tradition, a monastery was founded at Antrim in AD 495, thirty years after the death of Saint Patrick, to take forward his ministry, with a small settlement growing up around it. The round tower (see below), also known as "the Steeple", is all that remains. The original name of Antrim was Aontreibh, Irish for 'lone house', referring to the monks' house. This later became, or was reinterpreted, as Aontroim ('lone ridge').

In the early Middle Ages, the area was part of the Gaelic territory of Dál Araide, which covered much of what is now County Antrim. At the eastern edge of town is a ringfort called Rathmore (Ráth Mór, "the great fort"), which was the royal residence of the kings of Dál Araide.

In the late 12th century, the area was conquered by Anglo-Normans led by John de Courcy, becoming part of the Earldom of Ulster. They built a motte-and-bailey castle at Antrim. Its mound (motte) still stands in Antrim Castle Gardens.

The Anglo-Norman earldom collapsed in the early 14th century and Antrim became part of the Gaelic territory of Clannaboy. During the late Middle Ages, the O'Neill chiefs of Clannaboy were based at Edenduffcarrick castle (later called Shane's Castle), two miles west of Antrim.

Early Modern era
Following the Nine Years' War (1593–1603), Antrim came under English control. The area was then colonized by English and Scottish settlers as part of the Plantation of Ulster. Hugh Clotworthy, father of the Anglo-Irish politician John Clotworthy, 1st Viscount Massereene, supervised the building of Antrim Castle, a fortified mansion beside the old Norman motte. Hugh was knighted in 1617 and appointed High Sheriff of County Antrim. In 1642, during the Irish Confederate Wars, Clotworthy's fleet fought a naval engagement on Lough Neagh.

The Society of United Irishmen launched a rebellion in 1798, which began in Leinster and quickly spread to Ulster. The United Irishmen had been founded in 1791 by liberal Protestants in Belfast. Its goal was to unite Catholics and Protestants and to end British monarchical rule over Ireland and to found a sovereign, independent Irish republic. Although its membership was mainly Catholic, many of its leaders and members in northeast Ulster were Protestant Presbyterians. On 7 June 1798, about 4,000 United Irishmen led by Henry Joy McCracken attacked the town. The rebels were on the verge of taking the town until British reinforcements arrived. Thanks to a rebel band led by James Hope, most of the United Irishmen were able to withdraw safely. This is known as the Battle of Antrim.

Before the Act of Union, the parliamentary borough of Antrim returned two members to the Irish House of Commons by virtue of letters patent granted in 1666 by Charles II. It was disenfranchised in 1801.

Steeple House, a substantial 18th-century mansion which was home to the Clark family and then became the headquarters of Antrim Borough Council, was destroyed in a fire in July 2019.

The Troubles

There were several incidents in and around Antrim during the Troubles including, in 1976, when six civilians (5 Protestants and one Catholic) were shot and killed during a UVF gun attack on the Ramble Inn pub near Antrim.

Climate
As with the rest of Ireland, Antrim experiences a maritime climate with cool summers and mild winters. The nearest official Met Office weather station for which online records are available is at Belfast International Airport, under 4 miles to the south of the town centre.

The coldest night of the year averages  and 39 nights should register an air frost.

Demography
On Census day (27 March 2011) there were 23,375 people living in Antrim, accounting for 1.29% of the NI total, representing an increase of 16.9% on the Census 2001 population of 20,001. Of these:

 21.47% were aged under 16 years and 13.33% were aged 65 and over;
 48.72% of the usually resident population were male and 51.28% were female;
 54.80% belong to or were brought up in a Protestant or other Christian related background and 34.12% were brought up in a Catholic background;
 61.47% indicated that they had a British national identity, 30.76% had a Northern Irish national identity and 11.56% had an Irish national identity (respondents could indicate more than one national identity);
 35 years was the average (median) age of the population.
 8.43% had some knowledge of Ulster Scots and 5.20% had some knowledge of the Irish language.

Landmarks

 Shane's Castle and Antrim Castle
 In the north of the town is one of the most perfect of the round towers of Ireland, 93 feet high and 50 feet in circumference at the base. It stands in the grounds of Steeple, where there is also the "Witches' Stone", a prehistoric monument.
 There was a Castle, near the Six Mile Water, which was destroyed in a fire in 1922. All that remains is an octagonal tower.
 The river allowed the linen industry to be established. The linen industry has been replaced by a Technology Park, the only one in Northern Ireland.
 Antrim Market House is a 2–story building, nine bays long, three deep built in 1726. Formerly a Court House, it has recently been refurbished and is currently used as a tourist information centre and has a small theatre and café.
 The Castle Grounds, that is beside the Antrim Castle.
 The Springfarm Rath

Transport

Antrim railway station was opened on 11 April 1848, and closed for goods traffic in 1965.

Served by passenger trains on the Belfast-Derry railway line are run by Northern Ireland Railways.

Antrim's Aldergrove Airport known as Belfast International Airport is the largest airport in Northern Ireland, serving destinations in Britain, Europe and North America. However, Aldergrove does not have a proper Airport rail link connection.

Retail 
The Junction, formerly Junction One (named after junction 1 of the nearby M22 Motorway), is a retail park in the area with restaurants and a hotel. Supermarkets serving the town include an Asda store, Lidl outlet, Tesco Extra, and Iceland store. Castle Mall, located on High Street in the town, was formerly known as Castle Centre. It has a selection of every day shops, including the town's main Post Office.

Education
Junior schools serving the area include Antrim Primary School, Ballycraigy Primary School, Greystone Primary School, St Comgall's Primary School, and St Joseph's Primary School.

The secondary schools are Antrim Grammar School and Parkhall College.

The Greenmount campus of the College of Agriculture, Food and Rural Enterprise (CAFRE) is near Antrim.

Sport
The local Gaelic Athletic Association club is Naomh Comhghall CLG (St. Comgalls Antrim). The association football club, Chimney Corner F.C., plays its home games in Allen Park on Castle Road. Other Antrim sports clubs include Antrim Hockey Club and Muckamore Cricket Club.

People
 Mark Allen (b. 1986) – snooker player
 Declan Kearney (b. 1964) – Sinn Féin politician, MLA
 Thomas McCord (1750–1824) – businessman and politician in Lower Canada
 Eva McGown (1883–1972) – Official Hostess of Fairbanks and Honorary Hostess of Alaska
 Joseph Stephenson-Jellie (1874–1960) – cricketer
 Josh Rock (b. 2001) - darts player

See also
 List of localities in Northern Ireland by population
 Market Houses in Northern Ireland
 List of civil parishes of County Antrim

References

 Antrim on the Culture Northern Ireland website.

External links

Antrim Borough Council
Antrim Community Website

 
County towns in Northern Ireland
Towns in County Antrim
Civil parishes of County Antrim